Tour Postel 2001 is a skyscraper in Abidjan, Ivory Coast. The 26 story building was completed in 1984. It is located on the street Rue Jesse Owens. Once considered dangerous, and as a result condemned, the tower has undergone a 14 billion CFA franc renovation recently.

See also
Skyscraper design and construction
List of tallest buildings in Africa

References

Buildings and structures in Abidjan
Residential buildings completed in 1984
1984 establishments in Ivory Coast